The Southern Melbourne Saints, previously known as the St. Kilda Saints, the St. Kildas Pumas and Westside Saints, were an Australian professional basketball team based in Melbourne. The Saints competed in the National Basketball League (NBL) between 1979 and 1991.

History
St Kilda was one of the ten inaugural, foundation teams of the NBL that competed in the league's first season in 1979, operating out of Albert Park Basketball Stadium at the time. As the St Kilda Pumas, the team was the powerhouse team over the league's first three seasons behind coach Brian Kerle, winning three straight minor premierships and claiming the first two NBL Championships. In 1981, after finishing the regular season in first place, the Saints decided to compete in the FIBA Club World Cup in Brazil rather than contest the NBL finals. The team never regained this level of success, as they failed to qualify for the semi-finals for the rest of their tenure in the NBL.

In 1987, the Saints changed their name to incorporate a wider area of Melbourne rather than just the suburb of St Kilda. For the next three years, the team was known as the "Westside Saints", playing out of the 2,000-seat Keilor Stadium. In 1991, the team changed their name again, this time to the "Southern Melbourne Saints".

Prior to the 1992 season, the Saints merged with the Eastside Spectres to become the South East Melbourne Magic.

Honour roll

Season by season

References

External links

Basketball teams in Melbourne
Defunct National Basketball League (Australia) teams
Basketball teams established in 1979
1979 establishments in Australia
1991 disestablishments in Australia
Sport in the City of Port Phillip